Inta Airport  is an airport in Komi Republic, Russia located 2 km north of Inta.  It services small transport aircraft.

Airlines and destinations

References
RussianAirFields.com

Airports built in the Soviet Union
Airports in the Komi Republic